The Mary Tyler Moore Show is an American television series that originally aired from September 19, 1970, to March 19, 1977. Each season consisted of 24 half-hour episodes.

Series overview
All seven seasons have been released on DVD by 20th Century Fox Home Entertainment. In addition, the series is also available for streaming and download in the digital format.

Timeslot: 

Seasons 1–2: Saturday at 9:30 pm.

Seasons 3–6: Saturday at 9:00 pm.

Season 7: Saturday at 9:00 pm for episodes 1–6, then 8:00 pm for episodes 7–24.

Episodes

Season 1 (1970–1971) 
Consisted of 24 half-hour episodes airing on CBS.
Recurring characters introduced in the first season were: Mary Richards (Mary Tyler Moore), Lou Grant (Ed Asner), Murray Slaughter (Gavin MacLeod), Ted Baxter (Ted Knight), Rhoda Morgenstern (Valerie Harper), Phyllis Lindstrom (Cloris Leachman), Gordy the Weatherman (John Amos), Bess Lindstrom (Lisa Gerritsen), Ida Morgenstern (Nancy Walker), and Marie Slaughter (Joyce Bulifant).

Season 2 (1971–1972) 
Consisted of 24 half-hour episodes airing on CBS.

Season 3 (1972–1973) 
Consisted of 24 half-hour episodes airing on CBS.
Recurring Character Debuts: Georgette Franklin.
This is the last season to have the 1966 CBS in Color logo.

Season 4 (1973–1974) 
Consisted of 24 half-hour episodes airing on CBS.
Recurring Character Debuts: Sue Ann Nivens.
This was Valerie Harper's final season before leaving to star in a spin-off called Rhoda.

Season 5 (1974–1975) 
Consisted of 24 half-hour episodes airing on CBS.
This was Cloris Leachman's final season before leaving to star in a spinoff called Phyllis.

Season 6 (1975–1976) 
Consisted of 24 half-hour episodes airing on CBS.

Season 7 (1976–1977) 
Consisted of 24 half-hour episodes airing on CBS.

References

Mary Tyler Moore Show